The 2013–14 Top League was the 11th season of Japan's domestic rugby union competition, the Top League. It kicked off on 30 August 2013. The final was held on 9 February 2014 and won by Panasonic Wild Knights.

Teams
The Top League expanded from 14 to 16 teams for the 2013–14 season. The Sanix Blues team was relegated, and Coca-Cola West Red Sparks, Kubota Spears, Toyota Industries were promoted to the Top League for 2013–14.

Regular season
For the Pool stage, the 16 teams were placed into 2 pools of 8 teams each and a round-robin tournament was played within each of the pools.

Then, for the Group stage, the top 4 teams from each pool went through to Group 1, and the bottom 4 teams from each pool went through to Group 2. The teams were given starting points based on where they finished in their pool.
- i.e. starting points of 4, 3, 2, and 1, for 1st, 2nd, 3rd, and 4th respectively; and starting points of 4, 3, 2, and 1, for 5th, 6th, 7th, and 8th respectively.

Another round-robin was played for each of the groups. The Top League teams in Group 1 ranked 1st to 4th qualified for the title play-offs to fight for the Microsoft Cup and the Top League title. The top 4 also qualified directly into the All-Japan Rugby Football Championship.

The teams in Group 1 ranked 5th to 8th, and teams in Group 2 ranked 1st to 4th went through to the wildcard play-offs for qualification into the All-Japan Rugby Football Championship.

The teams in Group 2 ranked 5th to 7th went through to the promotion and relegation play-offs against regional challengers to fight to remain in the Top League. The team in Group 2 ranked 8th was automatically relegated to the regional leagues for 2014–15.

Table

Group stage tables

Pool stage tables

Pool stage

Group stage

Round 1

Round 2

Round 3

Round 4

Round 5

Round 6

Round 7

Title play-offs
Top 4 sides of the regular season competed in the Microsoft Cup (2014) knock out tournament to fight for the Top League title. The top 4 teams of 2013–14 were Panasonic Wild Knights, Suntory Sungoliath, Kobelco Steelers, and Toshiba Brave Lupus.

Semi-finals

Final

Wildcard play-offs
The Top League Group 1 teams ranked 5–8 and Group 2 teams ranked 1–4 played off over two rounds, with the second round winners qualifying for the All-Japan Rugby Football Championship.

First round

Second round

So Yamaha and Toyota advanced to the All-Japan Rugby Football Championship.

Top League Challenge Series

Fukuoka Sanix Blues won promotion to the 2014–15 Top League via the 2013–14 Top League Challenge Series, while Honda Heat, Mitsubishi Sagamihara DynaBoars and Yokogawa Musashino Atlastars progressed to the promotion play-offs.

Promotion and relegation play-offs
The Top League teams in Group 2 ranked 5th, 6th, and 7th, played-off against the Challenge 1 teams ranked 4th, 3rd, and 2nd, respectively, for the right to be included in the Top League for the following season.

So Coca-Cola West Red Sparks, NTT Docomo, and NTT remained in the Top League for the next season.

End-of-season awards

At the end of season awards, Panasonic Wild Knights flyhalf Berrick Barnes was named Top League MVP, a day after helping his side to the league title. He was handed his trophy by Japan coach Eddie Jones.

Team awards

Individual awards

Team of the season

References
 

Japan Rugby League One
2013–14 in Japanese rugby union
Japan top